

This page lists board and card games, wargames, miniatures games, and tabletop role-playing games published in 1989.  For video games, see 1989 in video gaming.

Games released or invented in 1989

Game awards given in 1989
 Spiel des Jahres: Café International

Significant games-related events in 1989
Coleco declares bankruptcy, and is acquired by Hasbro.

See also
 1989 in video gaming

Games
Games by year